The following is a partial list of the "C" codes for Medical Subject Headings (MeSH), as defined by the United States National Library of Medicine (NLM).

This list continues the information at List of MeSH codes (C02). Codes following these are found at List of MeSH codes (C04). For other MeSH codes, see List of MeSH codes.

The source for this content is the set of 2006 MeSH Trees from the NLM.

– parasitic diseases

– central nervous system parasitic infections

– central nervous system helminthiasis
  – neurocysticercosis
  – neuroschistosomiasis

– central nervous system protozoal infections
  – malaria, cerebral
  – toxoplasmosis, cerebral

– eye infections, parasitic

– acanthamoeba keratitis

– onchocerciasis, ocular

– toxoplasmosis, ocular

– helminthiasis

– cestode infections
  – diphyllobothriasis
  – sparganosis
  – echinococcosis
  – echinococcosis, hepatic
  – echinococcosis, pulmonary
  – hymenolepiasis
  – monieziasis
  – taeniasis
  – cysticercosis
  – neurocysticercosis

– helminthiasis, animal
  – dictyocaulus infections
  – dirofilariasis
  – fascioloidiasis
  – monieziasis
  – setariasis
  – strongyle infections, equine
  – toxocariasis

– nematode infections
  – adenophorea infections
  – enoplida infections
  – trichinosis
  – trichuriasis
  – larva migrans
  – larva migrans, visceral
  – secernentea infections
  – ascaridida infections
  – anisakiasis
  – ascariasis
  – ascaridiasis
  – toxascariasis
  – toxocariasis
  – larva migrans, visceral
  – oxyurida infections
  – oxyuriasis
  – enterobiasis
  – rhabditida infections
  – strongyloidiasis
  – spirurida infections
  – dracunculiasis
  – filariasis
  – dipetalonema infections
  – dirofilariasis
  – elephantiasis, filarial
  – loiasis
  – mansonelliasis
  – onchocerciasis
  – onchocerciasis, ocular
  – setariasis
  – strongylida infections
  – hookworm infections
  – ancylostomiasis
  – necatoriasis
  – oesophagostomiasis
  – strongyle infections, equine
  – trichostrongyloidiasis
  – dictyocaulus infections
  – haemonchiasis
  – ostertagiasis
  – trichostrongylosis

– trematode infections
  – clonorchiasis
  – dicrocoeliasis
  – echinostomiasis
  – fascioliasis
  – fascioloidiasis
  – opisthorchiasis
  – paragonimiasis
  – schistosomiasis
  – neuroschistosomiasis
  – schistosomiasis haematobia
  – schistosomiasis japonica
  – schistosomiasis mansoni

– intestinal diseases, parasitic

– anisakiasis

– balantidiasis

– blastocystis infections

– cryptosporidiosis

– dientamoebiasis

– dysentery, amebic

– giardiasis

– liver diseases, parasitic

– echinococcosis, hepatic

– fascioliasis

– liver abscess, amebic

– lung diseases, parasitic

– echinococcosis, pulmonary

– mesomycetozoea infections

– opportunistic infections

– aids-related opportunistic infections

– superinfection

– parasitemia

– parasitic diseases, animal

– babesiosis

– helminthiasis, animal
  – dictyocaulus infections
  – dirofilariasis
  – fascioloidiasis
  – monieziasis
  – setariasis
  – strongyle infections, equine
  – toxocariasis

– protozoan infections, animal
  – babesiosis
  – cryptosporidiosis
  – dourine
  – theileriasis
  – toxoplasmosis, animal
  – trypanosomiasis, bovine

– pregnancy complications, parasitic

– protozoan infections

– central nervous system protozoal infections

– ciliophora infections
  – balantidiasis

– coccidiosis
  – cryptosporidiosis
  – cyclosporiasis
  – isosporiasis
  – malaria
  – malaria, avian
  – malaria, cerebral
  – malaria, falciparum
  – blackwater fever
  – malaria, cerebral
  – malaria, vivax
  – sarcocystosis
  – toxoplasmosis
  – toxoplasmosis, animal
  – toxoplasmosis, cerebral
  – toxoplasmosis, congenital
  – toxoplasmosis, ocular

– protozoan infections, animal
  – babesiosis
  – cryptosporidiosis
  – dourine
  – theileriasis
  – toxoplasmosis, animal
  – trypanosomiasis, bovine

– sarcomastigophora infections
  – mastigophora infections
  – dientamoebiasis
  – giardiasis
  – leishmaniasis
  – leishmaniasis, cutaneous
  – leishmaniasis, diffuse cutaneous
  – leishmaniasis, mucocutaneous
  – leishmaniasis, visceral
  – trichomonas infections
  – trichomonas vaginitis
  – trypanosomiasis
  – chagas disease
  – chagas cardiomyopathy
  – dourine
  – African trypanosomiasis
  – trypanosomiasis, bovine
  – sarcodina infections
  – amebiasis
  – acanthamoeba keratitis
  – blastocystis infections
  – dysentery, amebic
  – entamoebiasis
  – liver abscess, amebic

– tick-borne diseases
  – babesiosis
  – theileriasis

– skin diseases, parasitic

– ectoparasitic infestations
  – lice infestations
  – mite infestations
  – scabies
  – trombiculiasis
  – myiasis
  – hypodermyiasis
  – screw worm infection
  – tick infestations

– larva migrans

– leishmaniasis
  – leishmaniasis, cutaneous
  – leishmaniasis, diffuse cutaneous
  – leishmaniasis, mucocutaneous

– onchocerciasis

– zoonoses

The list continues at List of MeSH codes (C04).

C03